Max Singewald (born 4 February 1933) is an Austrian ice hockey player. He competed in the men's tournament at the 1956 Winter Olympics.

References

1933 births
Living people
Olympic ice hockey players of Austria
Ice hockey players at the 1956 Winter Olympics
Sportspeople from Innsbruck